The 2016–17 Sint Maarten Soccer Association (SMSA) Senior League was the 41st season of top division football in Sint Maarten. The season begin on 2 October 2016 and ended on 10 April 2017.

Defending champions Flames United were the defending champions, but finished runners-up to Reggae Lions. Both teams earned a berth in the 2018 Caribbean Club Championship, should they elect to participate in the tournament.

Clubs 

A total of nine clubs participated during the season. Each team played every other team twice: once home and once away, for a 16-match season. Below is the table based on reported results.

Table

References

External links 
SMSA Homepage via CONCACAF

SMSA Senior League seasons
Sint Maarten
football
football